"Take Away the Colour" is a 1993 song by British Eurodance artist Ice MC. It was released as the first single from his third album, Ice'n'Green (1994), on which it appears as third track, and his ninth single overall. It was written and produced by Robyx, while the female vocals were performed by Simone Jay. The song was reissued a year later, in 1995, in a new version entitled "Take Away the Colour ('95 Reconstruction)", however, this version is performed by Alexia. The first version was more successful, reaching the top 20 in Austria, Belgium (Wallonia and Flanders), Italy and Sweden. The B-side featuring on the various formats of the 1995 release is a megamix composed by ICE MC's hit single "Think about the Way", "It's a Rainy Day" and "Take Away the Colour". This megamix was the next single in France and was only released in this country.

Track listings
These are the formats and track listings of major single releases of "Take Away the Colour".

1994 release
 CD maxi - Europe
 "Take Away the Colour" (radio mix) — 3:29
 "Take Away the Colour" (HF mix) — 6:45
 "Take Away the Colour" (VCF mix) — 5:08

 CD maxi - Australia
 "Take Away the Colour" (radio mix) — 3:25
 "Take Away the Colour" (HF mix) — 6:41
 "Take Away the Colour" (Rob X remix) — 6:14
 "Take Away the Colour" (to be sampled) — 3:27

 CD single
 "Take Away the Colour" (radio mix) — 3:28
 "Take Away the Colour" (HF mix) — 6:44

 12" maxi - Europe
 "Take Away the Colour" (HF mix) — 6:41
 "Take Away the Colour" (VCF mix) — 5:06
 "Take Away the Colour" (radio mix) — 3:25

 CD maxi - Remixes - Germany
 "Take Away the Colour" (Rob X remix) — 6:14
 "Take Away the Colour" (uannanatu remix) — 7:10
 "Take Away the Colour" (trance dub) — 6:23

 CD maxi - Remixes - Italy
 "Take Away the Colour" (radio 7" version) — 3:25
 "Take Away the Colour" (Rob X remix) — 6:14
 "Take Away the Colour" (FOS vocal dub) — 7:17
 "Take Away the Colour" (uannanatu remix) — 7:10
 "Take Away the Colour" (trance dub) — 6:33
 "Take Away the Colour" (VCF mix) — 5:06
 "Take Away the Colour" (to be sampled) — 3:27

 12" maxi - Remixes
 "Take Away the Colour" (Rob X remix) — 6:14
 "Take Away the Colour" (FOS vocal dub) — 7:18
 "Take Away the Colour" (uannanatu remix) — 7:10
 "Take Away the Colour" (trance dub) — 6:33
 "Take Away the Colour" (to be sampled) — 3:27

1995 release
 CD maxi - Sweden
 "Take Away the Colour" ('95 Reconstruction short radio edit) — 3:59
 "Take Away the Colour" ('95 Reconstruction) — 5:27
 "Megamix (extended version) — 8:44
 "Take Away the Colour" (original LP version) — 3:25
 "Megamix (short radio version) — 4:14
 "Take Away the Colour" (Rob X remix) — 6:14

 CD maxi - Belgium
 "Take Away the Colour" (original LP version) — 3:25
 "Take Away the Colour" ('95 Reconstruction short) — 3:59
 "Take Away the Colour" ('95 Reconstruction long) — 5:27
 "Take Away the Colour" (Rob X remix) — 6:14
 "Megamix Short" — 4:14
 "Megamix Long" — 8:44

 CD maxi - Germany
 "Take Away the Colour" ('95 Reconstruction) — 3:59
 "Megamix" (short version) — 4:14
 "Take Away the Colour" ('95 Reconstruction) — 5:27
 "Take Away the Colour" (Rob X remix) — 6:14

 CD single - France, Belgium
 "Take Away the Colour" (original LP version) — 3:25 (Belgium only)
 "Take Away the Colour" ('95 Reconstruction short) — 3:59
 "Take Away the Colour" ('95 Reconstruction long version) — 5:27 (France only)

 12" maxi - Belgium
 "Take Away the Colour" ('95 Reconstruction short) — 3:59
 "Take Away the Colour" (Rob X remix) — 6:14
 "Take Away the Colour" (original LP version) — 3:25
 "Take Away the Colour" ('95 Reconstruction long) — 5:27
 "Megamix Short" — 4:14

 12" maxi - Germany, Spain, Italy
 "Take Away the Colour" ('95 Reconstruction) — 5:27
 "Take Away the Colour" ('95 Reconstruction short) — 3:59
 "Megamix" (extended version) — 8:44
 "Megamix" (short version) — 4:14

 12" maxi - France
 "Take Away the Colour" ('95 Reconstruction) — 5:27
 "Take Away the Colour" (Rob X remix) — 6:14

Charts

Weekly charts

Year-end charts
1995 version

References

1993 songs
1993 singles
1994 singles
Songs written by Roberto Zanetti
Ice MC songs
Dance Pool singles
Polydor Records singles